Phacelia longipes is a species of phacelia known by the common name longstalk phacelia. It is endemic to California, where it grows in the Transverse Ranges and adjacent western Mojave Desert. Its habitat includes chaparral, woodland, and forest, in rocky soils.

Description
Phacelia longipes is an annual herb growing decumbent or erect to a maximum length of about 40 centimeters. It is glandular and coated lightly in soft and stiff hairs. Most of the leaves are low on the plant, the toothed oval blades borne on long petioles. The hairy, glandular inflorescence is a one-sided curving or coiling cyme of bell-shaped flowers. Each flower is roughly a centimeter long and white to light blue in color. It has a calyx of linear sepals and five long, protruding stamens.

External links
Jepson Manual Treatment — Phacelia longipes
Phacelia longipes — Photo gallery

longipes
Endemic flora of California
Flora of the California desert regions
Natural history of the California chaparral and woodlands
Natural history of the Mojave Desert
Natural history of the Transverse Ranges
~
~
Flora without expected TNC conservation status